The 2018 New York Open was a men's tennis tournament played on indoor hard courts. It was the first edition of the event in New York after it moved from Memphis, and part of the ATP World Tour 250 series of the 2018 ATP World Tour. The event took place at the Nassau Veterans Memorial Coliseum in Uniondale, New York, United States, from February 12 through 18, 2018. The tournament was the first on the ATP World Tour to use black tennis courts.

Singles main draw entrants

Seeds

 Rankings are as of February 5, 2018.

Other entrants
The following players received wildcards into the singles main draw:
  Sebastian Korda
  Mackenzie McDonald
  Noah Rubin

The following players received entry from the qualifying draw:
  Ernesto Escobedo 
  Bjorn Fratangelo 
  Adrián Menéndez Maceiras 
  Stefano Travaglia

Withdrawals
Before the tournament
  Chung Hyeon → replaced by  Mikhail Youzhny

Retirements
  Peter Gojowczyk

Doubles main draw entrants

Seeds

 Rankings are as of February 5, 2018.

Other entrants
The following pairs received wildcards into the doubles main draw:
  Darian King /  Frances Tiafoe
  Mackenzie McDonald /  Max Schnur

The following pair received entry as alternates:
  Radu Albot /  Nikoloz Basilashvili

Withdrawals
Before the tournament
  Sam Querrey

Champions

Singles

  Kevin Anderson def.  Sam Querrey, 4–6, 6–3, 7–6(7–1)

Doubles

  Max Mirnyi /  Philipp Oswald def.  Wesley Koolhof /  Artem Sitak, 6–4, 4–6, [10–6].

References

External links
 Official website

New York Open (tennis)
New York Open
New York Open (tennis)
New York Open
2018 in American tennis